The 2014–15 EHF Cup was the 34th edition of the EHF Cup, the second most important European handball club competition organised by the European Handball Federation (EHF), and the third edition since the merger with the EHF Cup Winners' Cup.

Overview

Team allocation
The labels in the parentheses show how each team qualified for the place of its starting round:
TH: Title holders
CW: Cup winners
CR: Cup runners-up
1st, 2nd, 3rd, 4th, 5th, 6th, etc.: League position
ECL: Transferred from the EHF Champions League
QS: Losers from the qualification tournaments

Round and draw dates
All draws were held at the European Handball Federation headquarters in Vienna, Austria.

Qualification stage
The qualification stage consisted of three rounds, which were played as two-legged ties using a home-and-away system. In the draws for each round, teams were allocated into two pots, with teams from Pot 1 facing teams from Pot 2. The winners of each pairing (highlighted in bold) qualified for the following round.

For each round, teams listed first played the first leg at home. In some cases, teams agreed to play both matches at the same venue.

Round 1
A total of 34 teams entered the draw for the first qualification round, which was held on Tuesday, 22 July 2014. The first legs were played on 6–7 September and the second legs were played on 13–14 September 2014.

|}
Notes

a Both legs were hosted by Bregenz.
b Both legs were hosted by Krienz-Luzern.
c Both legs were hosted by OCI-Lions.
d Both legs were hosted by Orosháza.

e Both legs were hosted by Potaissa Turda.
f Both legs were hosted by ÍBV.
g Both legs were hosted by Talent M.A.T. Plzeň.
h Both legs were hosted by BESA Famiglia.

Round 2
A total of 40 teams entered the draw for the second qualification round, which was held on Tuesday, 22 July 2014. Among these teams were the fourth-placed teams from the 2014–15 EHF Champions League qualification tournaments (Pot 1) and the 17 winners of the previous round (Pot 2). The first legs were played on 11–12 October and the second legs were played on 18–19 October 2014.

|}
Notes

a Both legs were hosted by SMD Bacău.
b Both legs were hosted by Nexe Našice.

c Both legs were hosted by Handball Esch.
d Both legs were hosted by Elverum.

Round 3
A total of 32 teams entered the draw for the third qualification round, which was held on Tuesday, 21 October 2014. Among these teams were the runners-up and third-placed teams from the 2014–15 EHF Champions League qualification tournaments (Pot 1) and the 20 winners of the previous round.  The first legs were played on 11–12 October and the second legs were played on 18–19 October 2014. The 16 winners qualified for the group stage.

|}

Group stage

Draw and format
The draw of the EHF Cup group phase took place on Thursday, 4 December 2014, at 11:00 CET. The 16 teams allocated into four pots were drawn into four groups of four teams. The country protection rule was applied, i.e. two clubs from the same country could not face each other in the same group.

In each group, teams played against each other home-and-away in a round-robin format. The matchdays were 14–15 February, 21–22 February, 28 February – 1 March, 7–8 March, 14–15 March, and 21–22 March 2015.

If Füchse Berlin, as the organiser of the Final 4 tournament, win their group or finish among top three second-ranked teams, they will receive a direct qualification to the Final 4 tournament. If the German side wins their group then the other three group winners and the three best second ranked team will qualify for the quarter-finals. If the Germans finish among the top three second-ranked teams, the quarter-finals will consist of four group winners and two best second-ranked teams. If Füchse Berlin finish as the worst second-ranked team, they will have to play the quarter-final match. Should the German club rank on the third or fourth position in their group, they will be out of the competition, but they will still organize the Final 4 tournament.

If two or more teams are equal on points on completion of the group matches, the following criteria are applied to determine the rankings (in descending order):
number of points in matches of all teams directly involved;
goal difference in matches of all teams directly involved;
higher number of plus goals in matches of all teams directly involved;
goal difference in all matches of the group;
higher number of plus goals in all matches of the group;

If no ranking can be determined, a decision shall be obtained by drawing lots. Lots shall be drawn by the EHF, if possible in the presence of a responsible of each club.

Seeding
On 1 December 2014, EHF announced the composition of the group phase seeding pots.

Group A

Group B

Group C

Group D

Ranking of the second-placed teams
The ranking of the second-placed teams was carried out on the basis of  the team's results in the group stage. Because the German side Füchse Berlin, the organizers of the Final 4 tournament, finished on top of their group they qualified directly to the final tournament and only the top three second-placed teams qualified to the quarter-finals.

Knockout stage

Quarter-finals

Draw and format
Because the hosts of the Final 4 tournament, Füchse Berlin, finished the group stage among the group winners, they have clinched the direct ticket to the final weekend and decided that only three quarter-finals will be played for the remaining spots in the final tournament. The draw of the EHF Cup quarter-finals took place on Tuesday 24 March 2015 at the EHF headquarters in Vienna, Austria. Six teams were positioned into two pots with the country protection rule not applied: two clubs from the same country could face each other in the quarter-finals. However, teams from the same group could not face each other in the quarter-finals. The first pot contained the three group winners and the second pot contained the top three second-placed teams.

In the quarter-finals, teams played against each other on a home-and-away basis, with the teams from second pot playing the first leg at home. The first leg matches were played over 11–12 April, and the second leg matches were played over 18–19 April.

|}

Final four
The tournament was played at the 8,700 capacity Max-Schmeling-Halle in the German capital Berlin, the home of Füchse Berlin.

Top goalscorers

See also
2014–15 EHF Champions League
2014–15 EHF Challenge Cup

References

External links
EHF Cup (official website)

Cup
Cup
EHF Cup seasons